Přerovská hůra (historically also Bělice or Bílá hůrka) is a flat hill in the Central Bohemian Region of the Czech Republic. It is situated in the Central Elbe Table within the Polabí lowland.

A fortification was built on the top of the hill during the Iron Age and was used by the Celts and early Slavs. The fortification is not dug out.

Gallery

External links 
 Aerial Photography of the top of Přerovská hůra - Celtic Oppidum
 3D Photographs of The top of Přerovská hůra

Mountains and hills of the Czech Republic
Nymburk District